Jack London (1876–1916) was an American author.

Jack London may also refer to:

People
 Jack London (athlete) (1905–1966), British athlete
 Jack London (boxer) (1913–1964), British boxer
 Jack London (businessman) (1937–2021), American technology executive
 Jack London, later Hansadutta Das (1941-2020), German-born religious leader

Other uses
 Jack London (fashion label), Australian men's fashion label
 Jack London (film), a 1943 film biography of the author Jack London

See also 
John London (disambiguation)
Jack London District
Jack London Square
Jack London State Historic Park

London, Jack